Loved Ones is a jazz duo album by Ellis Marsalis and Branford Marsalis. Originally conceived as Ellis's solo record of songs about "unforgettable women," it became a duo project based on his realization that "Branford would sound really good on some of (the songs).". The album reached Number 5 on the Billboard Top Jazz Albums chart.

In his AllMusic review, Scott Yanow calls the set "pleasing and thoughtful if not quite essential," noting that Branford's contributions "sometimes (liven) up the selections although mostly playing a subsidiary role to his father." Don Heckman, writing in the Los Angeles Times, called the recording "one of the most appealing CDs of the year," citing "the warm camaraderie of the father-son musical connection."

Track listing

Personnel
 Branford Marsalis – saxophones
 Ellis Marsalis - piano

References

External links
 BranfordMarsalis.com
 

1996 albums
Branford Marsalis albums
Ellis Marsalis Jr. albums
Instrumental duet albums